Christopher Reinhard (born 19 May 1985, in Offenbach am Main) is a German former professional footballer who played as a defender.

Honours
Eintracht Frankfurt
 DFB-Pokal runners-up: 2005–06

References

External links
 
 

1985 births
Living people
Sportspeople from Offenbach am Main
Association football defenders
German footballers
Footballers from Hesse
Germany under-21 international footballers
Germany youth international footballers
Bundesliga players
2. Bundesliga players
Eintracht Frankfurt players
Eintracht Frankfurt II players
Kickers Offenbach players
Karlsruher SC players
Karlsruher SC II players
FC Ingolstadt 04 players
SV Eintracht Trier 05 players
TGM SV Jügesheim players
1. FC Magdeburg players